Andreas Stensland Løwe (born 14 October 1983 in Larvik, Norway) is a Norwegian jazz pianist from Hedrum, living in Oslo, with a taste for electronic sound processing. He is known from bands like Splashgirl, Silent Velcro and The Captain & Me, and collaborations with artists like Hanne Kolstø, Frida Ånnevik and Susanna Wallumrød.

Biography 
As a major composer and pianist in Splashgirl Løwe has played a series of concerts in places from Japan in the east to Seattle in the west, and he has released several albums. He also has appeared as a composer of a number of commissioned works, including for the Tape to Zero Festival in Oslo, and composed music for stage and movies.

Discography 

With Splashgirl
2007: Doors. Keys. (AIM Records)
2009: Arbor (Hubro Music)
2011: Splashgirl / Huntsville (Hubro Music)
2011: Pressure (Hubro Music)
2013: Field Day Rituals (Hubro Music)

With Xtet Project
2009: Phase First (Bushbaby Records)

With Rutger Zuydervelt
2014: Stay Tuned'' (Baskaru Records)

References

External links 

20th-century Norwegian pianists
21st-century Norwegian pianists
Norwegian jazz pianists
Norwegian jazz composers
Male jazz composers
1983 births
Living people
Musicians from Vestfold
Hubro Music artists
Norwegian male pianists
20th-century Norwegian male musicians
21st-century Norwegian male musicians
Splashgirl members